Race to Space is a 2001 fictional American family drama film. The film was shot on location at Cape Canaveral and Cocoa Beach and Edwards AFB in cooperation with NASA and the U.S. Air Force.

Plot
During the 1960s space race between the United States and the Soviet Union, Dr. Wilhelm von Huber, a top NASA scientist, relocates to Cape Canaveral with his 12-year-old son, Billy. Their relationship has become strained in the wake of the recent death of Billy's mother, and the ever-widening gap between father and son has become obvious.

Billy finds his father old-fashioned and boring. He wants to lead an exciting life: to be a hero like the astronaut Alan Shepard.

However, Billy's life takes an exciting turn when he is hired by Dr. Donni McGuinness, the Director of Veterinary Sciences, to help train the chimpanzees for NASA space missions. Billy begins to develop a close bond with one particular chimpanzee named Mac. With Billy's help and companionship, Mac is chosen to become the first American astronaut launched into space.

All seems like a wonderful game until Billy realizes that his new friend is being prepared to be hurled hundreds of miles into orbit on a historical mission - and that someone at NASA is about to sabotage the mission. Mac's big chance to explore the farthest frontier and hurtle America ahead in the race to space might easily cost him his life.

Cast
 James Woods as Dr. Wilhelm von Huber
 Annabeth Gish as Dr. Donni McGuinness
 Alex D. Linz as Wilhelm ‘Billy’ von Huber
 William Devane as Roger Thornhill
 William Atherton as Ralph Stanton
 Wesley Mann as Rudolph 
 Mark Moses as Alan Shepard
 Tony Jay as Narrator

Reception
Common Sense Media rated the film 3 out of 5 stars.

See also
 Monkeys and apes in space
 Ham, the first chimpanzee in space
 Enos, the second chimpanzee in space and only one to orbit the Earth

References

External links
 
 

2001 films
2001 drama films
American drama films
Films directed by Sean McNamara
Brookwell McNamara Entertainment films
Films set in 1961
Films set in Florida
Films about space programs
Animals in space
2000s English-language films
Films about father–son relationships
2000s American films